Massimo Moreno Savić (6 June 1962 – 23 December 2022), also known simply as Massimo, was a Croatian pop singer.

His father was a native of Tulež near Aranđelovac. His mother was Italian from Istria, a native of Raša near Labin.

He first became popular in the 1980s with his band Dorian Gray, and then soon embarked on a successful solo career. He won five Porin awards for best male vocal performance, 2004–2007, and in 2012.

In 2013, Massimo's thirty-year anniversary concert sold out the Pula Arena. It featured Vlado Kreslin, Neno Belan, and Nina Badrić as guests, and was also broadcast live by the Croatian Radiotelevision. He was one of the judges on the second series of X Factor Adria.

Massimo died from lung cancer at Sisters of Charity Hospital in Zagreb on 23 December 2022, at the age of 60. He was buried at the Zadar City Cemetery on 3 January 2023.

sq:Massimo Savić

Discography

Albums
 with Dorian Gray – Sjaj u tami, Jugoton, 1983
 with Dorian Gray – Za tvoje oči, Jugoton, 1985
 Stranac u noći, Jugoton, 1987
 Riječi čarobne, Jugoton, 1988
 Muzika za tebe, Jugoton, 1989
 Zemlja plesa, Jugoton, 1990
 Elements, Helidon, 1992
 with Labin Art Express – Metal Guru - Body, Energy & Emotions, 1993
 Benzina, Croatia Records/Tutico, 1995
 with Labin Art Express – Metal Guru - Hero in 21st Century, 1998
 Massimo, Aquarius Records/Multimedia Records, 2003
 Vještina, Aquarius/Multimedia Records, 2004
 Massimo - Zlatna kolekcija, Croatia Records, 2004
 Apsolutno Uživo - live Iz Kluba Aquarius, Aquarius, 2005
 Vještina 2, Aquarius, 2006
 Sunce se ponovo rađa, Aquarius, 2008
 Massimo Sings Sinatra, Aquarius, 2010
 Dodirni me slučajno, Aquarius, 2011
 1 dan ljubavi, Aquarius, 2015
 Sada (2018)

Singles

References

External links
 
 
 

1962 births
2022 deaths 
Deaths from lung cancer in Croatia
People from Pula
21st-century Croatian male singers
Croatian pop singers
Yugoslav male singers
Hayat Production artists
20th-century Croatian male singers